Spatial anxiety is a sense of anxiety an individual experiences while processing environmental information contained in one's geographical space (in the sense of Montello's classification of space), with the purpose of navigation and orientation through that space (usually unfamiliar, or very little known). Spatial anxiety is also linked to the feeling of stress regarding the anticipation of a spatial-content related performance task (such as mental rotation, spatial perception, spatial visualisation, object location memory, dynamic spatial ability). Particular cases of spatial anxiety can result in a more severe form of distress, as in agoraphobia.

Classification 
It is still investigated whether spatial anxiety would be considered as one solid, concrete ("unitary") construct (including the experiences of anxiety due to any spatial task), or whether it could be considered to be a "multifactorial construct" (including various subcomponents), attributing the experience of anxiety to several aspects. Evidence has shown that spatial anxiety seems to be a "multifactorial construct" that entails two components; that of anxiety regarding navigation and that of anxiety regarding the demand of rotation and visualization skills.

Gender and further individual differences 
Gender differences appear to be one of the most prominent differences in spatial anxiety as well as in navigational strategies. Evidence show higher levels of spatial anxiety in women, who tend to choose route strategies, as opposed to men, who tend to choose orientation strategies (a fact which, in turn, has been found to be negatively related to spatial anxiety).

Spatial anxiety levels also seem to vary across different age groups. Evidence has shown spatial anxiety to appear also, early on, during the elementary school years, with anxiety varying in level and tending to be stable; with minimum fluctuations, across life span.

Measuring instruments 
There are two primary ways of measuring spatial anxiety. One of them is Lawton's Spatial Anxiety Scale, which was dominant during its era of creation. The other is the Child Spatial Anxiety Questionnaire, which was first one to assess spatial anxiety levels related to other spatial abilities  other than navigation and map reading.

Lawton's Spatial Anxiety Scale 
The scale measures the degree of anxiety regarding the individual's experience and performance, in tasks assessing one's information processing related to the environment; such as way-finding and navigation.

In total there are eight statements. Some examples are "leaving a store that you have been to for the first time and deciding which way to turn to get to a destination" and "finding your way around in an unfamiliar mall". The rating takes place on a 5-point scale, expressing the degree of anxiety with a continuum from "not at all" to "very much".

Child Spatial Anxiety Questionnaire  
The Child Spatial Anxiety Questionnaire was designed for young children and attempts to assess anxiety related to a wider (than usually) range of spatial abilities. Children are asked to report the level of anxiety they feel while in particular spatial abilities-demanding situations. In total it includes eight situations. Some examples are: "how do you feel being asked to say which direction is right or left?", "how do you feel when you are asked to point to a certain place on a map, like this one?", "how do you feel when you have to solve a maze like this in one minute?".

In the original version, the rating takes place on a 3-point scale which includes three different faces; each facial expression, representing a different emotional state (getting from "calm", to "somewhat nervous", to "very nervous"). The revised version assessment takes place on a 5-point scale, with two more facial expressions added.

See also 

 Spatial cognition 
 Agoraphobia
 Navigation
 Sex differences in psychology

References

External links 

 Child Spatial Anxiety Questionnaire (CSAQ) (northwestern.edu)
 SpatialAnxietyQuestionnaire A sample of the CSAQ's items

Anxiety
Spatial cognition
Navigation
Orientation (geometry)
Agoraphobia